Midlands Christian College (MCC) is an independent co-educational high school of about 300 pupils ranging from form 1 to form 6, located in the city of Gweru, Zimbabwe. The college has boarding facilities as well as providing for day-scholars. Its name refers to its location in the Midlands Province in central Zimbabwe.

Midlands Christian College is a member of the Association of Trust Schools (ATS) and the Head is a member of the Conference of Heads of Independent Schools in Zimbabwe (CHISZ).

MCC is a Christian school which teaches Creationism as well as Evolution but teaches students that creationism is what the school believes in and also encourages students to research on arguments against evolution. It also actively encourages conversion to Christianity on the part of its pupils.

MCC's campus provides both primary school education and a small Teacher Training Complex. The Teacher Training Programme was closed in 2014.Mcc

A notable ex-student who excelled in sport, David Pocock, he made a name for himself in rugby and Australian politics thanks to values and skills he learnt at MCC.

See also
 List of schools in Zimbabwe
 List of boarding schools

References

External links
 Midlands Christian College website

Midlands Christian College
Private schools in Zimbabwe
Boarding schools in Zimbabwe
Cambridge schools in Zimbabwe
Educational institutions established in 1987
1987 establishments in Zimbabwe
Member schools of the Association of Trust Schools